Symphyotrichum welshii (formerly Aster welshii) is an imperiled species of flowering plant of the aster family (Asteraceae) endemic to only certain western states in the United States, specifically Arizona, Idaho, Montana, Utah, and Wyoming, and is found at elevations of . Its bloom time is August–October, and it grows in wet soils that occur in dry areas. 

Symphyotrichum welshii is classified in the subgenus Symphyotrichum, section Symphyotrichum, subsection Dumosi. It is one of the "bushy asters and relatives."

Citations

References

welshii
Endemic flora of the United States
Flora of the United States
Plants described in 1994
Taxa named by Arthur Cronquist